Jan Benzien (born 22 July 1982) is a German slalom canoeist who has competed at the international level since 1999. Benzien started out as a C1 paddler. Since 2012 he has also been competing in C2, teaming up with Franz Anton.

He won eleven medals at the ICF Canoe Slalom World Championships with two golds (C1 team: 2006, C2: 2015), eight silvers (C1: 2002; C1 team: 2002, 2005, 2007, 2010, 2011, 2013; C2 team: 2015), and a bronze (C1: 2009). He won additional 16 medals at the European Championships (3 golds, 7 silvers, and 6 bronzes).

Benzien competed at the 2008 Summer Olympics in Beijing. In the C1 event, he finished second in the qualification round, thus progressing to the semifinals. In the semifinals, Benzien finished twelfth, failing to reach the top eight and the final round. At the 2016 Summer Olympics, he placed fourth in the C2 event, together with teammate Franz Anton.

Benzien serves with the German Army and has a degree in sport management from the Vocational Academy of Riesa. He is married to the Olympic canoeist Mandy Planert; they have children, Justus Jonas and Mika. In 2014, he launched a canoe rental company in Leipzig.

World Cup individual podiums

References

External links

 
 
 
 

1982 births
Canoeists at the 2008 Summer Olympics
Canoeists at the 2016 Summer Olympics
German male canoeists
Living people
Olympic canoeists of Germany
Sportspeople from Giessen
Medalists at the ICF Canoe Slalom World Championships